This is a list of compositions by Albert Dietrich.

Piano

Piano solo
Vier Klavierstücke, Op. 2
Sechs Klavierstücke, Op. 6

Piano, four hands
Sonata in G major for piano, four hands, Op. 19

Chamber music

Violin and Piano
Allegro for Violin and Piano (1st movement of F-A-E Sonata)

Cello and Piano
Cello Sonata in C, Op. 15
Intermezzo for Cello and Piano, Op. 116/4

Piano Trio
Piano Trio No. 1 in C minor, Op. 9
Piano Trio No. 2 in A, Op. 14

Orchestral

Symphonies
Symphony in D minor, Op. 20

Violin and orchestra
Violin Concerto in D minor, Op. 30

Cello and orchestra
Cello Concerto in G minor, Op. 32

Horn and orchestra
Introduction and Romance for Horn and Orchestra, Op. 27

Other
Normannenfahrt, Op. 26
Overture in C major for Orchestra, Op. 35

Incidental music
Cymbeline, Op. 38

Opera
Robin Hood, Op. 34 (A new production at the Theater Erfurt had its premiere on March 20, 2011.)
Das Sonntagskind
Die Braut vom Liebenstein
Charles d'Anjou

Choral music
Morgenhymne 'Phöbos Apollon, seliger Gott' aus 'Elektra' von Hermann Allmers, Op. 24
Altchristlicher Bittgesang, Op. 25
Rheinmorgen, Op. 31
Weihnachtslied, Op. 37

Lieder
Widmung, Op. 1/1
Nachtlied, Op. 1/2
All'weil giebt es kein grössere Lust, Op. 1/3
Die alte Linde, Op. 1/4
Liederfrühling, Op. 1/5
Frühlings-Aufruf, Op. 1/6
Tröstung, Op. 1/7
Die Trauerweide, Op. 1/8
"Kein Leid ist grösser als Herzeleid", Op. 1/9
Ade, Op. 1/10
Ritter Frühling, Op. 3/1
Früh Morgens, Op. 3/2
Im April, Op. 3/3
Hinab von den Bergen, Op. 3/4
Erwachen, Op. 3/5
Des Müden Abendlied, Op. 3/6
Frühlingsandacht, Op. 4/1
Du weisst es nicht, Op. 4/2
Ständchen, Op. 4/3
Der Liebe Lust und Leid, Op. 4/4
Liebeslenz, Op. 4/5
Du fragst warum, Op. 4/6
Ueberall Liebchen, Op. 4/7
Vom Pagen und der Königstochter, Op. 5
Unter dem Schatten, Op. 7/1
Mein Liebchen naht, Op. 7/2
Murmelndes Lüftchen, Op. 7/3
Abschied, Op. 7/4
Wenn du zu den Blumen gehst, Op. 7/5
Es regnet, Op. 8/1
Wie hat die Nacht so weh gethan, Op. 8/2
Zauberkreis, Op. 8/3
Wenn sich zwei Herzen recht verstehen, Op. 8/4
Schneeglöckchen, Op. 8/5
An den Abendstern, Op. 8/6
Mit dem blauen Federhute, Op. 10/1
Ob sie meiner noch gedenket, Op. 10/2
Ein Heil kamst du gezogen, Op. 10/3
Hoch um die Bergeskuppen, Op. 10/4
Still weht die Nacht, Op. 10/5
Der Storch ist längst hinunter, Op. 10/6
Einzug, Op. 11/1
Frühling, Op. 11/2
An die Nacht, Op. 11/3
Das Mädchen spricht, Op. 11/4
Sommer, Op. 11/5
Zauberbann, Op. 11/6
März, Op. 12/1
Frühling über's Jahr, Op. 12/2
War schöner als der schönste Tag, Op. 12/3
Dämmerung senkte sich von oben, Op. 12/4
Im Sommer, Op. 12/5
Fern, ach fern, Op. 13/1
Will ruhen unter den Bäumen hier, Op. 13/2
Glocken zur See, Op. 13/3
Gute Nacht, Op. 13/4
Treulieb' ist nimmer weit, Op. 13/5
Ach, wie weh tuth Scheiden, Op. 13/6
Dein Auge, Op. 16/1
Ja oder Nein, Op. 16/2
Meine Linde, Op. 16/3
Frühlingabend, Op. 16/4
Um Mitternacht, Op. 16/5
Wenn ich ihn nur habe, Op. 16/6
An meiner Thüre du blühender Zweig, Op. 33/1
Immer schaust du in die Ferne, Op. 33/2
Unter blühenden Bäumen, Op. 33/3
Es führen die Elfen den den Reigen, Op. 33/4
Ueber Liebchens Dache, Op. 33/5
Seefahrers Heimweh, Op. 33/6
Es sollte der letzte Tag ja sein, Op. 36/1
Waldruhe, Op. 36/2
O, sei mir hold, du segnender Augenstrahl, Op. 36/3
Nun ist ein jeder Nerv in mir, Op. 36/4
Maria, Mutter der Gnaden, Op. 39/1
Schlaftrunken wallen die Bäche, Op. 39/2
Die Amsel ist's, die so heimlich singt, Op. 39/3
Nun ist die Nacht vergangen, Op. 39/4
In dein abgrundtiefes Auge blickt ich, Op. 39/5
Mein bist du, mein, Op. 39/6

References

External links
List of compositions (in German)

Dietrich, Albert